Dicolectes ornatus is a species of leaf beetle of the Democratic Republic of the Congo, described by Martin Jacoby in 1894.

References 

Eumolpinae
Beetles of the Democratic Republic of the Congo
Taxa named by Martin Jacoby
Beetles described in 1894
Endemic fauna of the Democratic Republic of the Congo